In algebra and number theory, Wilson's theorem states that a natural number n > 1 is a prime number if and only if the product of all the positive integers less than n is one less than a multiple of n.  That is (using the notations of modular arithmetic), the factorial  satisfies

exactly when n is a prime number. In other words, any number n is a prime number if, and only if, (n − 1)! + 1 is divisible by n.

History
This theorem was stated by Ibn al-Haytham (c. 1000 AD), and, in the 18th century, by John Wilson. Edward Waring announced the theorem in 1770, although neither he nor his student Wilson could prove it. Lagrange gave the first proof in 1771.  There is evidence that Leibniz was also aware of the result a century earlier, but he never published it.

Example
For each of the values of n from 2 to 30, the following table shows the number (n − 1)! and the remainder when (n − 1)! is divided by n.  (In the notation of modular arithmetic, the remainder when m is divided by n is written m mod n.)
The background color is blue for prime values of n, gold for composite values.

Proofs
	
The proofs (for prime moduli) below use the fact that the residue classes modulo a prime number are a field—see the article prime field for more details. Lagrange's theorem, which states that in any field a polynomial of degree n has at most n roots, is needed for all the proofs.

Composite modulus

If n is composite it is divisible by some prime number q, where . Because  divides , let   for some integer . Suppose for the sake of contradiction that  were congruent to  where n is composite. Then (n-1)! would also be congruent to −1 (mod q) as  implies that  for some integer  which shows (n-1)! being congruent to -1 (mod q). But (n − 1)! ≡ 0 (mod q) by the fact that q is a term in (n-1)! making (n-1)! a multiple of q. A contradiction is now reached.

In fact, more is true. With the sole exception of 4, where 3! = 6 ≡ 2 (mod 4), if n is composite then (n − 1)! is congruent to 0 (mod n). The proof is divided into two cases: First, if n can be factored as the product of two unequal numbers, where 2 ≤ a < b ≤ n − 2, then both a and b will appear in the product  and (n − 1)! will be divisible by n. If n has no such factorization, then it must be the square of some prime q, q > 2. But then 2q < q2 = n, both q and 2q will be factors of (n − 1)!, and again n divides (n − 1)!.

Prime modulus

Elementary proof

The result is trivial when , so assume p is an odd prime, . Since the residue classes (mod p) are a field, every non-zero a has a unique multiplicative inverse, a−1. Therefore, with the exception of ±1, the factors of  can be arranged in disjoint pairs such that product of each pair is congruent to 1 modulo p. This proves Wilson's theorem.

Proof using Fermat's little theorem

Again, the result is trivial for p = 2, so suppose p is an odd prime, . Consider the polynomial

g has degree , leading term , and constant term . Its  roots are 1, 2, ..., .

Now consider

h also has degree  and leading term . Modulo p,  Fermat's little theorem says it also has the same  roots, 1, 2, ..., .

Finally, consider

f has degree at most p − 2 (since the leading terms cancel), and modulo p also has the  roots 1, 2, ..., . But Lagrange's theorem says it cannot have more than p − 2 roots. This is Wilson's theorem.

Proof using the Sylow theorems

It is possible to deduce Wilson's theorem from a particular application of the Sylow theorems. Let p be a prime. It is immediate to deduce that the symmetric group  has exactly  elements of order p, namely the p-cycles . The third Sylow theorem implies

Multiplying both sides by  gives

that is, the result.

Applications

Primality tests
In practice, Wilson's theorem is useless as a primality test because computing (n − 1)! modulo n for large n is computationally complex, and much faster primality tests are known (indeed, even trial division is considerably more efficient).

Used in the other direction, to determine the primality of the successors of large factorials, it is indeed a very fast and effective method. This is of limited utility, however.

Quadratic residues
Using Wilson's Theorem, for any odd prime , we can rearrange the left hand side of

to obtain the equality

This becomes

or

We can use this fact to prove part of a famous result: for any prime p such that p ≡ 1 (mod 4), the number (−1) is a square (quadratic residue) mod p.  For this, suppose p = 4k + 1 for some integer k.  Then we can take m = 2k above, and we conclude that (m!)2 is congruent to (−1) (mod p).

Formulas for primes
Wilson's theorem has been used to construct formulas for primes, but they are too slow to have practical value.

p-adic gamma function
Wilson's theorem allows one to define the p-adic gamma function.

Gauss' generalization

Let's call such numbers , where . 

Gauss proved given an odd prime  and some integer , then 

.

This allows us to pair each of the elements together with its inverse. We are left now with  being its own inverse. If  is a root, it follows that  is also a root.

Let's consider . Then we notice we have one root since .

Consider .

Say . It is again clear there are two solutions. 

We now consider .

Finally, let's look at the general case where .

Then . Otherwise, we can say the product is -1. So we can conclude that

.

See also
Wilson prime
Table of congruences

Notes

References

The Disquisitiones Arithmeticae has been translated from Gauss's Ciceronian Latin into English and German. The German edition includes all of his papers on number theory: all the proofs of quadratic reciprocity, the determination of the sign of the Gauss sum, the investigations into biquadratic reciprocity, and unpublished notes.
.
.
.

External links
 

 Mizar system proof: http://mizar.org/version/current/html/nat_5.html#T22
 

Modular arithmetic
Factorial and binomial topics
Articles containing proofs
Theorems about prime numbers
Primality tests